Turbonilla villeni is a species of sea snail, a marine gastropod mollusk in the family Pyramidellidae, the pyrams and their allies. It was identified and named by Penas and Rolan in 2010.

References

External links
 To Encyclopedia of Life
 To World Register of Marine Species

villeni
Gastropods described in 2010